The 2021 Úrvalsdeild kvenna, known as Pepsi Max deild kvenna for sponsorship reasons, is the 50th season of the women's association football highest division league in Iceland. Breiðablik are the defending champions after claiming the 2020 championship.

Teams
The 2021 Úrvalsdeild kvenna is contested by 10 teams, eight of which played in the division the previous season and two promoted from the 2020 1. deild kvenna. The bottom two teams from the previous season, FH and KR were relegated to the 1. deild kvenna and were replaced by Keflavík and Tindastóll, the winner and runners-up of the 2020 1. deild kvenna respectively.

Source: Scoresway

League table

References

External links
 

Isl
1
2021